Babai Abbai is a 1985 Indian Telugu-language comedy film written and directed by Jandhyala. It stars Nandamuri Balakrishna and Anitha Reddy, with music composed by Chakravarthy. The film is inspired by the Telugu film Vaddante Dabbu (1954), which itself was based on the English novel Brewster's Millions (1902) by George Barr McCutcheon.

Plot
The film begins with two con artists Bala & Veera who meet in a very crazy situation and start living together. Out of goodwill, they call each other as Babayi-Abbayi, and their livelihood is making debts and absconding from lenders. Once Bala is acquainted with a beautiful girl Krishnaveni / Krishna, daughter of a multi-millionaire Vara Prasada Rao and they fall in love. Being cognizant of it, Vara Prasada Rao assigns a task for Bala by allocating a huge amount of Rs.25 lakhs and asks him to spend it within 30 days. Eventually, warns him not to donate or destroy the money. At present, Bala starts the task under the guidance of Babai in various methods such as racing, gambling, making a movie, constructing the house, etc. But their income grows day by day when Bala feds up with this money. Ultimately, he throws the money into the sea when Vara Prasada Rao arrives. At last, he affirms, the task is to study the character of Bala and he should also perceive the fruitlessness of treacherous money. Finally, the movie ends on a happy note with the marriage of Bala & Krishna.

Cast

Nandamuri Balakrishna as Bala / Balasubramanyam
Anitha Reddy as Krishna Veni
Suthi Veerabhadra Rao as Babai / Veerabhadra Rao  
Suthi Velu as Vara Prasad Rao
Rajendra Prasad as Taxi Driver 
Rallapalli as Babai's Father-in-law
Kota Srinivasa Rao
Vizag Prasad as Inspector Shyam Sundar / Akitabhuchar
Malladi as Lawyer
Potti Prasad as Madman
KK Sarma 
Chitti Babu 
Satti Babu as Manager Jabar
Chidatala Appa Rao 
Dham
Jeet Mohan Mitra 
Sri Lakshmi as Aruna
Kakinada Shyamala as Aruna's mother 
Radha Kumari as Subbulu
Pavala Syamala as Sundari 
Nirmalamma as Godaramma

Soundtrack
The music was composed by Chakravarthy. Lyrics were written by Veturi.

References

External links 
 

1985 films
Films directed by Jandhyala
Films scored by K. Chakravarthy
Films based on Brewster's Millions
Films based on American novels
1980s Telugu-language films